The Superintendent of Public Instruction, sometimes referred to as the State Superintendent of Schools, was a constitutional office within the executive branch of the Oregon state government from 1872 to 2012, when it was eliminated by state law. The superintendent acted as administrative officer of the State Board of Education and was executive head of the Department of Education. The superintendent was elected by the people of Oregon in a nonpartisan statewide ballot for a term of office of four years.

Duties
The superintendent's responsibilities included providing leadership for some 551,290 elementary and secondary students in Oregon’s 198 school districts, as well as those enrolled in public preschool programs, the state Schools for the Blind and the Deaf, programs for children with disabilities and education programs for young people in statewide juvenile corrections facilities.

The superintendent had no direct control over policy, which was set by the Board of Education, and which adopts rules affecting local school districts, who are ultimately responsible for establishing policy at the district level. As chief administrator, however, the superintendent had considerable influence on policy through recommendation to the Board, and certification and licensing authority. 

As chief administrative officer for the Department of Education, the superintendent oversaw state funding for schools, and made budget recommendations to the governor's office, subject to action by the state legislature.

Office elimination
As part of a broader education policy overhaul, a 2011 state law eliminated the elected office of Superintendent of Public Instruction and consolidated its functions with the office of Governor. Under the current system, the Governor appoints a Deputy Superintendent of Public Instruction to act as day-to-day administrator of the department. The Deputy Superintendent is a professional position, as opposed to an elected position. The appointee must further have at least five years of experience as a school administrator and is subject to approval by the Oregon Senate. The law enacting the change took effect on June 29, 2012, when Susan Castillo, the last person to be elected Superintendent, resigned to take a job in the private sector.

List of Oregon's superintendents of public instruction
The following table lists the twenty individuals who held the office of Superintendent of Public Instruction with dates of service:
<div style="float:left;text-align:left;padding-right:15px">

References

 
1872 establishments in Oregon
2012 disestablishments in Oregon